The 1998 ABN AMRO World Tennis Tournament was a men's tennis tournament played on indoor carpet courts. It was the 26th edition of the event known that year as the ABN AMRO World Tennis Tournament, and was part of the ATP World Series of the 1998 ATP Tour. It took place at the Rotterdam Ahoy indoor sporting arena in Rotterdam, Netherlands, from 2 March through 8 March 1998. Unseeded Jan Siemerink won the singles title.

The singles field was led by ATP No. 3, US Open champion and Grand Slam Cup finalist Patrick Rafter, US Open semifinalist and Australian Open quarterfinalist Jonas Björkman, and US Open runner-up, Split finalist, Antwerp winner Greg Rusedski. Other seeds competing were recent London titlist Yevgeny Kafelnikov, St. Petersburg winner and Rotterdam defending champion Richard Krajicek, Sergi Bruguera and Goran Ivanišević.

Finals

Singles

 Jan Siemerink defeated  Thomas Johansson, 7–6(7–2), 6–2
It was Jan Siemerink's 1st title of the year, and his 3rd overall.

Doubles

 Jacco Eltingh /  Paul Haarhuis defeated  Neil Broad /  Piet Norval 7–6, 6–3

References

External links
 Official website
 ITF tournament edition details

 
ABN AMRO World Tennis Tournament
ABN AMRO World Tennis Tournament
ABN AMRO World Tennis Tournament